The 1929–32 Nordic Football Championship was the second Nordic Football Championship staged. Four Nordic countries participated, Denmark, Finland, Norway and Sweden. The tournament was arranged by the Swedish Football Association (SvFF) which celebrated its 25th anniversary. The trophy was named the Guldkrus (Golden Cup). A total of 24 matches were played and 130 goals scored giving an average of 5.42 goals per match.

Results

1929

1930

1931

1932

Table

Winner

Statistics

Goalscorers

See also
Balkan CupBaltic CupCentral European International CupMediterranean Cup

References

External links 
Nordic Championships 1929-32 at RSSSF

1924-28
1929–30 in European football
1930–31 in European football
1931–32 in European football
1932–33 in European football
1929–30 in Swedish football
1930–31 in Swedish football
1931–32 in Swedish football
1932–33 in Swedish football
1929–30 in Danish football
1930–31 in Danish football
1931–32 in Danish football
1932–33 in Danish football
1929 in Norwegian football
1930 in Norwegian football
1931 in Norwegian football
1932 in Norwegian football
1929 in Finnish football
1930 in Finnish football
1931 in Finnish football
1932 in Finnish football